Pornchok Larpyen (born 2 April 1994) is a Thai boccia player who represented Thailand at the 2016 and 2020 Summer Paralympics. He won two bronze medals at the 2016 Summer Paralympics, one in the Pairs BC4 event and another in the Individual BC4 event.

References

External links
 

1994 births
Living people
Pornchok Larpyen
Pornchok Larpyen
Pornchok Larpyen
Pornchok Larpyen
Paralympic medalists in boccia
Boccia players at the 2016 Summer Paralympics
Boccia players at the 2020 Summer Paralympics
Medalists at the 2016 Summer Paralympics
Medalists at the 2020 Summer Paralympics
Sportspeople with cerebral palsy
Pornchok Larpyen
Pornchok Larpyen